Frostburg is a city in Allegany County, Maryland. The town is one of the first cities on the "National Road", US 40, and the western terminus of the Western Maryland Scenic Railroad. It is part of the Cumberland MD-WV metropolitan statistical area,

Frostburg was originally called Mount Pleasant until 1820, when the government developed a postal service, and the town was renamed Frostburg. Since 1973, the city has been served by what is now Interstate 68.

The City of Frostburg has an approximate year-round population of 8,075. The total population was 9,002 at the 2010 census. In addition, 5,400 students attend Frostburg State University, a public university within the University System of Maryland.

Geography

Frostburg is located in the Allegheny Mountains on the eastern slope of Big Savage Mountain. The closest cities to Frostburg are Cumberland,  to the east, and Morgantown, West Virginia,  to the west.

Climate
Under the Köppen climate classification, it has a humid continental climate (Dfb), with cold, snowy winters, and warm, humid summers. Sub- occur on 3.8 nights per year, while, on average, there are 1.4 days with + highs, though these are not recorded every year.

History

19th century
Frostburg had its beginnings back in 1811 when surveying began for the National Pike, a road used to transport crops and raw materials to East Coast markets. President Thomas Jefferson had authorized construction of the road in 1806. Meshach Frost built the first house in present-day Frostburg in 1812 and named it Highland Hall (on the present-day the site of St. Michael's Church and Rectory). This building was a popular stopping point for celebrities and dignitaries who traveled the National Pike. This would be followed by the Franklin Hotel and other hotels.

The Baltimore and Ohio Railroad (B&O) and the Chesapeake and Ohio Canal reached Cumberland in 1842 and 1850, respectively. Consequently, travel on the National Pike saw a steady decline, although travel through Frostburg did not. Coal mining was the first major economic draw, but the industry faced problems in its early manifestation. The mountains of western Maryland and Frostburg proved to make transportation of coal very difficult. Not until the completion of the railroads did the coal industry in Frostburg began to flourish. The first major coal producer was Meshech Frost, who owned a significant amount of land for mining and founded the Frostburg Coal Company. This eventually was sold to the much larger Consolidated Coal Company.

Structures from the coal industry's dominant period still remain. One of the major freight depots for coal is located at 19 Depot St. in Frostburg and is one of the few remaining depots in western Maryland. The Mount Savage Railroad was the first to build a rail line to Frostburg in 1852, and it connected to the B&O Railroad in Cumberland, as well as the C&O Canal. The Cumberland and Pennsylvania Railroad (C&P) took over the Mount Savage line in 1854, and expanded with the construction of a tunnel under Frostburg, and a rail line southward to Piedmont, West Virginia. This railroad and tunnel were used to transport coal between Frostburg and George's Creek.  Another major economic turn for Frostburg was the manufacture of fire brick beginning in 1864, utilizing the high-grade fire clays which are found in the area. One of the main businesses that formed was the Big Savage Fire Brick Company, still one of the main suppliers of fire bricks on the East Coast.

In 1898, the Maryland General Assembly authorized State Normal School #2 and a $20,000 appropriation to construct a building, though no money to buy land. The money for the land was collected among local citizens, many of them coal miners and their families.

Two years later the first building, Old Main, opened. Two years after that, the first classes were held. The only available course of study at that point was a two-year elementary-education program. In 1904, the first class graduated.

In 1934, State Normal School #2 introduced its first four-year program. Nearly 30 years later (1963), the school finally was renamed Frostburg State College. In the next ten years more programs sprouted, including the university's first graduate program (Master's of Science in management).

In 1987, Frostburg State College joined the University System of Maryland and was renamed Frostburg State University. FSU celebrated its centennial in 1998.

Major events

National Register Sites
The Hocking House was listed on the National Register of Historic Places in 1982.  The Frostburg Historic District was listed in 1983 and the Borden Mines Superintendent's House in 1984.

Tornado

On June 2, 1998, an F4 tornado struck Frostburg and the adjacent Eckhart Mines valley, damaging more than 125 homes and Frost Elementary School. This tornado refutes the myth that tornadoes do not occur in rough terrain.

Schools and universities
 Beall Elementary School, Grades K–5
 Frost Elementary School, Grades K–5
 Mount Savage School, Grades K–8, in Mount Savage, Maryland
 Mountain Ridge High School, Grades 9–12
 St. Michael School K–5
 Frostburg State University

Demographics

The median household income was of 2007 was $25,485, and the median family income was $53,234. Males had a median income of $35,417 versus $26,094 for females. The per capita income for the city was $16,437. About 6.1% of families and 28.6% of the population were below the poverty line in 2007, with 17.4% below 50% of the poverty level. The cost of living index in 2008 was 84.3.

The estimated house value in 2007 was $126,106. The median real estate property tax for housing units in 2000 was 1.1%.

2010 census
As of the 2010 census, there were 9,002 people, 3,184 households, and 1,364 families residing in the city. The racial makeup of the city was 83.3% White, 12.5% African American, 0.2% Native American, 1.7% Asian, 0.1% Pacific Islander, 0.5% from other races, and 1.7% from two or more races. Hispanic or Latino of any race were 2.2% of the population.

There were 3,184 households, of which 19.1% had children under the age of 18 living with them, 30.9% were married couples living together, 8.8% had a female householder with no husband present, 3.1% had a male householder with no wife present, and 57.2% were non-families. 37.8% of all households were made up of individuals, and 13.3% had someone living alone who was 65 years of age or older. The average household size was 2.13 and the average family size was 2.78.

The median age in the city was 22.9 years. 11.5% of residents were under the age of 18; 43.2% were between the ages of 18 and 24; 15.6% were from 25 to 44; 16.2% were from 45 to 64; and 13.4% were 65 years of age or older. The gender makeup of the city was 48.6% male and 51.4% female.

Transportation

The main transportation means to and from Frostburg are by road. The main highway directly serving Frostburg is U.S. Route 40 Alternate, which follows Main Street through downtown. Interstate 68/U.S. Route 40 is the main highway serving the region around Frostburg, which is accessible from Frostburg proper via Maryland Route 36 and Maryland Route 736.

Local art and culture

Arion Band is a community band based in Frostburg. Established in 1877, the band has now been performing for 129 years. The band gives five to ten performances in the Frostburg and Cumberland areas during the summer. During prohibition, the Arion band helped the speakeasy in the basement of the Hotel Gunter sneak in booze. While the band would play music on the balcony, liquor was smuggled into the back.

Frostburg Museum and The Museum Gallery
Located at the corner of Hill and Oak Streets, the building in which the museum is housed was built in 1899 and was formerly the Hill Street School. The Museum Gallery features a different artist's work every month.

Mountain City Traditional Arts
Located at 25 East Main St., Mountain City Traditional Arts is dedicated to the education, sales, and documentation of regional Appalachian art.  There is a constant display of local art of various mediums, some of which is available for purchase.  Frequently offered are live performances, literary readings, and music.  They also offer classes such as knitting, card-making and holiday music.

Frostburg Arts and Entertainment District
In July 2009, a portion of downtown Frostburg that includes the Frostburg Museum and Frostburg State University was officially designated as the 18th Arts & Entertainment District of the state of Maryland, in recognition of the neighborhood's rich artistic history, its contemporary arts scene and its promise for the future.  The district is administered by the Allegany Arts Council, which also administers the award-winning downtown Arts & Entertainment District in nearby Cumberland.  Maryland is the first state to create art districts to help stimulate the economy.

Frostburg Art Walk
In the spring of each year, Frostburg sponsors an art walk through the arts and entertainment district.   Visitors are invited for a self-guided tour through the district.  Local businesses open their doors with special exhibits and demonstrations.

Performing Arts Center
Located on the Frostburg State University campus, the Performing Arts Center (PAC) has regular programs held in one of their three theaters.  The Cultural Events Series is open to students, faculty, and the general public.  The students who are studying dance, music, theater and communication can excel in the Performing Arts Center because it has the basic essentials plus more needed for these majors. It has three main theaters: Pealer Recital Hall, Drama Theater and the Studio Theater. This building also has rehearsal spaces, music practice rooms and electronic labs, shops, offices, classrooms and facilities for the hearing impaired. The community and the campus audiences are welcome to a variety of concerts and many performances. Also many famous comedians and jazz artists that perform there as well.

Roper Gallery
Located in the Fine Arts building on Frostburg State University's campus, the Roper gallery hosts fine art exhibits from both senior year art students and traveling exhibits.

Planetarium
The Frostburg State University planetarium is located in GIRA CCIT.  The planetarium offers a different show every month, which are shown on Sundays at 4PM and 7PM.

Appalachian Festival
The Appalachian Festival occurs every year on the third weekend in September on Frostburg State University's upper quad.  The festival highlights music, food, and crafts of the Appalachian region.  Artisans from the area come and sell their wares in areas of woodworking, quilts, and glasswork.  There are children's activities offered and educational opportunities.  There are often live animals in a petting zoo format.  There are tents that offer instruction in folk skills such as dancing, soap making, and basket making.

The Western Maryland Scenic Railroad

The Western Maryland Scenic Railroad runs between Cumberland at Canal Place and Frostburg. The depot at Frostburg was originally designed for the Cumberland and Pennsylvania Railroad by architect Ephraim Francis Baldwin and built in 1891. The train stops at the Frostburg Depot for ninety minutes so passengers may shop or eat lunch. The locomotive is detached, rotated on the turntable and run around and reattached to the other end of the train for its journey back to Cumberland. These manoeuvers takes about fifteen minutes and attract a lot of attention from the passengers, most of whom are tourists. Surrounding the depot are Linns Bar and Grill, The Trail Inn and Cafe, The Great Allegheny Passage Hiking/Biking Trail, and the Thrasher Carriage Museum. The standard train ride departs at 11:30AM from the Cumberland station and lasts approximately 3.5 hours. The railroad also offers caboose rentals and a variety of specialty trains such as a Murder Mystery train, a Christmas themed train, and a night-time Santa Express.

Thrasher Carriage Museum
The museum gives visitors the chance to take a look back in time to the nineteenth century to see how the people in that century were transported. There are examples of the different types of vehicles there. For example, there are funeral wagons, carts, pleasure vehicles, carts a milkman would have used and a lot more. There are docents who dress up in the Victorian American clothing from that time.  It gives the visitors the feeling that they are going back in time. This museum really gives visitors a chance to look into the life of a person from the 19th century. The Thrasher Carriage Museum was named after James Richard Thrasher. He lived in Midland, Maryland and was born in 1913.  Mr. Thrasher developed a love of horses at a very early age which led him into collecting carriages and participating in various parades just to show off his collection. He died in 1987.

Historic Downtown Frostburg
Historical Downtown Frostburg was constructed between the years of 1870–1915 when the town was entrenched in the mining and brick making industry.

The Princess Restaurant, located on Main St., has been in business since 1939.  Former President Truman visited the restaurant shortly after he left office; a framed sign hangs above the booth in which he sat.

The Hotel Gunter, located on Main St across the street from the Princess Restaurant, opened in 1897.  Originally named Hotel Gladstone, the original hotel had 100 rooms, a cafe, a barbershop, and a sample room for displaying traveling salesmen's wares.  The hotel tanked and was sold in 1903 to William Gunter, who renamed it the Hotel Gunter in 1925.  He installed a jail for prisoners being transferred and a cock-fighting ring in the basement.  The hotel's basement was also used as a speakeasy during prohibition.

Municipal activities
The Frostburg Community Swimming Pool is located at 200 South Water St.

The Frostburg Public Rifle Range is located at Clifton Terrace just off Rt. 40.  The range has four 100 yard firing lanes, one 200 yard firing lane, and a 6 lane 25 meter pistol range.

The Mapelhurst Country Club golf course features 18 holes, and 6,677 yards of course.

The Frostburg Dog Park is a large open space with separate fenced sections for large and small dogs to let dogs socialize with each other, play, and roam off-leash.

Parks
Parris N. Glendening Recreation Complex, named for a previous Governor of Maryland, is located at Shaw St. and Rynex Ave. The park offers 7 athletic fields, two basketball courts, two pavilions, a playground, two fishing ponds, and a half-mile walking trail.
Frostburg Community Park is located on South Water St.  The park has two baseball fields, two pavilions, a basketball court, a playground, and a pool.
Mount Pleasant Street Park is located on Maryland Ave. and Mt. Pleasant St.  The park has a basketball court, a playground, and a small baseball field.
East End Park is located at Cemetery Road and McCulloh St.  The park offers a playground and an indoor pavilion with a kitchen area.
West End Park is located on Mechanic St. and Wenck's Lane.  The park has a large pavilion and a field.
Calhoun Park, on Willow Lane, is home to the Frostburg Dog Park.

Center for Creative Writing
Located on Main Street, the Center for Creative Writing aims to bring creative writers to Frostburg and to expand the writing ability and exposure to literature of the residents and students of Frostburg.  They host a variety of events open to the public.  There are also workshops that can be attended for a small fee.  They sponsor the 3 AM Society, an organization of student writers.

Films about Frostburg
As part of the 2012 Bicentennial Celebrations, the City of Frostburg commissioned a documentary production titled A Day in the Life of Frostburg.  Directed and edited by Frostburg resident and filmmaker, Michael Snyder, the film was shot by a group of 37 "citizen filmmakers" (residents of the city) working independently and together; a unique approach to filmmaking that lets people tell the story of life in their town from the inside out. Over 2,200 clips (nearly 30 hrs of video) were shot during a two-week filming period and then edited together in three weeks to make a 30-minute documentary.

Media and information

Radio stations
 560 AM/105.3/98.5 WFRB FM Country, local talk, offers online streaming
1270 AM WCBCNews/Talk information, locally owned and operated with online streaming
 91.9/96.3 WFWM FM 24hr informational/educational/cultural radio station
100.9 Today's and yesterday's favorites
 97.1 WLIC FM religious radio, talks on separation of religion and state, offer online streaming
 94.1 QZK FM top 40 hits
107.1 WCBC FM Oldies station; Total Hits Radio
106.1 GO FM Classic Rock and new Rock
 99.5 WDZN-FM (Z-100) modern rock and alternative
100.5 WDYK-FM (Magic 100.5) Adult Contemporary

Libraries
The Ort Library, located on Frostburg State University's campus, was opened in 1975.  The library offers an online catalog of all books and articles in the Maryland state school system.  Those materials can be transferred to Frostburg for students and staff. Their website also houses Research Port, a database of databases of articles from journals, magazines, and print.  The library also offers special collections, archives, subject guides, government document research guide, and genealogy resources.  There are a large number of computers available for use.

The Frostburg Library, located at 65 E Main St, offers members of the community  of books, a children's area, and new technology.  They offer services such as children's, teen, and adult book sections, magazines, music, and more.  There are computers in the facility, and there is a meeting room in the library that can be rented.

City officials
 Mayor:                W. Robert Flanigan
 City Administrator:   Elizabeth Stahlman
 Chief of Police:      Nicholas J. Costello 
 Fire Chief:           Nick Green

Notable landmarks
 God's Ark of Safety, a roadside landmark, is a skeletal steel structure representing the biblical Noah's Ark being built on the I-68 highway hillside since 1976.
 The Frostburg Palace Theatre is located on 31 east Main Street. Since as early as 1907, the local people of Frostburg have gone there to see good films. In 1912, the Palace Theatre company bought the building and remodeled it as a movie theatre until 1981. Beginning in 1981, it rooted itself into the community through having local school performances.  The theatre shows foreign, classic and independent films.
 The Great Allegheny Passage is a  system of biking and hiking trails for the public that connects Cumberland, MD to Pittsburgh, PA.
 Frostburg State University was founded in 1898. Beginning as a university for teachers, Frostburg became a liberal arts school in 1960. Today, Frostburg State University has 4,755 undergraduate students, 630 graduates, and an 18:1 student faculty ratio.
 The historic Hotel Gunter first opened on New Years Day in 1897, with a barber shop, petting zoo, and jail inside. US Marshals would often stay at the hotel when transporting prisoners down Route 40 to Washington DC, and the jail was built to hold said prisoners. The hotel opened a speakeasy and cockfighting ring during prohibition. As of 2023, the building has a restaurant, apartments, and 12 hotel rooms.

Notable people

 Brad Barkley, novelist and short-story writer
 James Glenn Beall, Republican U.S. Senator, 1953–1965
 George Beall, Maryland lawyer
 Charles J. Colgan, Virginia state senator
 Andy Duncan, science fiction and fantasy writer
 Stephen Dunn, poet and winner of the Pulitzer Prize
 Jack Fisher, Major League Baseball pitcher
 M. Virginia Rosenbaum, surveyor and newspaper editor
 John J. Hafer, Republican Maryland State Senator, 1991–2007
 Jon Jenkins, National Football League player
 Ray Kuhlman, pilot and minor league baseball owner
 T. H. Paul, locomotive manufacturer
 Bob Robertson, Major League Baseball player
 James Sprigg, Whig U.S. Congressman from Kentucky, 1841–1843

Nearby places

Cities
 Cumberland
 Hagerstown
 Morgantown, West Virginia

Smaller communities
 Barton
 Callimont, Pennsylvania
 Carpendale, West Virginia
 Cresaptown
 Eckhart Mines
 Gilmore
 Klondike
 La Vale
 Lonaconing
 Midland
 Vale Summit
 Wellersburg, Pennsylvania
 Woodland

Notes

References

External links

 
Cities in Allegany County, Maryland
Cities in Maryland
Georges Creek Valley
National Road
Populated places in the Cumberland, MD-WV MSA